Philippe Chappuis (born December 15, 1967), better known by his pen name Zep, is a Francophone Swiss cartoonist and illustrator. Zep is mostly known for his comics series Titeuf which he created in 1992, and has become since one of the most popular children's comics in French-speaking countries. He also founded the associated Franco-Belgian comics magazine Tchô!.

Biography
Philippe Chappuis was born on December 15, 1967, in the city of Onex on the outskirts of Geneva in Switzerland; he is the son of a policeman and a clothes designer. As a child, he was an avid reader of Franco-Belgian comics or bande dessinée, and dreamed of becoming a professional cartoonist. At the age of 12, he took the artist name "Zep" as a nod to English rock band Led Zeppelin. As a teenager, he studied decorative arts in Geneva.

Zep's career as cartoonist began with the creation of the character Victor, whose comics were published in a weekly women's magazine and then in Belgian children's comic magazine Spirou in 1987. Zep also drew comics for several fanzines.

In the early 1990s, Zep created the comic series Titeuf inspired by memories of his own childhood. At first struggling to find publication, the series was initially published in the fanzine Sauve qui peut before it was noticed by Glénat executive Jean-Claude Camano. Zep joined Glénat in 1992, and the first Titeuf album, Dieu, le sexe et les bretelles (God, Sex And Suspenders) was published in 1993. It sold only a few thousand copies, but the following books have gradually won over a huge readership, outselling traditional French favorites such as Astérix and Lucky Luke. More than 23 million copies of the series have been sold, and the series is considered the greatest moneymaker in the French comics market. Titeuf books have been translated into 15 languages, including Chinese, Italian and German. In the UK, Titeuf appeared under the name Tootuff in The Dandy. The comics has been adapted into an animated series and a feature-length film, directed by Zep.

In 1998, he was one of the founders of children's comic magazine Tchô!, featuring Titeuf as its mascot, and with Zep as the lead editor. Tchô! featured comics from various authors, including series authored by Zep such as Titeuf, Les Chronokids (with artists Stan & Vince) and Captain Biceps (with artist Tébo), the latter of which was adapted into an animated series.

With cartoonist and illustrator Hélène Bruller, Zep co-authored sex education manual Le guide du zizi sexuel featuring illustrations with characters from Titeuf. Zep and Bruller also co-authored the children's book Les Minijusticiers which was adapted into an animated series.

In 2004, Zep was the recipient of the Grand Prix de la ville d'Angoulême, a lifetime achievement award which is one of the most prestigious in Franco-Belgian comics, making Zep the first Swiss author to receive the award.

In 2006, Zep authored Découpé en tranches, an autobiographical graphic novel in the form of short stories in which the author details various aspects of his life.

In 2009, he authored the adult comic album Happy Sex, a compilation of humorous stories about sexuality. It was followed in 2010 by Happy Girls and Happy Rock which were re-editions of Les filles électriques and L'enfer des concerts respectively, originally released in the late 1990s. In 2014, Zep released the comic album Happy Parents about parenthood, and in 2019 Happy Sex 2 as a follow-up to Happy Sex.

In the 2010s, Zep released graphic novels such as Une histoire d'hommes (2013), Un bruit étrange et beau (2016) and The End (2018), which were received by some critics as works outside of children's comics that cover mature themes, in an art style that has been described as more "realistic" than his previous works.

Himself a hobbyist guitar player who has played for a number of Swiss bands, Zep also designed album covers for Jean-Jacques Goldman (Chanson pour les pieds, 2001), Bill Deraime (Bouge encore, 2008), Henri Dès (Casse-pieds, 2013) and Renaud (Les mômes et les enfants d’abord, 2019), for whom he also directed the music video for Renaud's song "Les animals".

Personal life 
Zep was previously married to French illustrator and comic artist Hélène Bruller, with whom he co-authored the children's comic Les Minijusticiers and sex education book Le guide du zizi sexuel. He later married Swiss writer Mélanie Chappuis.

Bibliography 

 Victor n’en rate pas une, 1988
 Léon Coquillard, scenario by Gilli, 1990
 Kradok : Amanite Bunker, scenario by Leglode, 1991
 Les amours contrariées de Calin et Labelle, 1995
 Les filles électriques, 1997
 L’enfer des concerts, 1999
 Mes héros de la Bande Dessinée, 2001
 Les mini-justiciers (The Minimighty Kids), scenario by Hélène Bruller, 2003
 Petite poésie des saisons, 2005
 Découpé en tranches, 2006
 Portraits de famille, scenario by Benoît Mouchart, 2006
 Titeuf
 Dieu, le sexe et les bretelles, 1993
 L’amour c’est pô propre, 1993
 Ça épate les filles, 1994
 C’est pô juste, 1995
 Titeuf et le derrière des choses, 1996
 Tchô, monde cruel, 1997
 Le miracle de la vie, 1998
 Lâchez-moi le slip, 2000
 La loi du préau, 2002
 Nadia se marie, 2004
 Mes meilleurs copains, 2006
 Le sens de la vie, 2008
 À la folie, 2012
 Bienvenue en adolescence, 2015
 À fond le slip, 2017
 Petite poésie des saisons, 2019
 La grande aventure, 2021
  Captain Biceps, art by Tébo
 L'invincible, 2004
 Le redoutable, 2005
 L'invulnérable, 2006
 Les Chronokids, art by Stan & Vince (6 tomes, 2008-2018)
 Happy Books
 Happy Sex, 2009
 Happy Girls, 2010
 Happy Rock, 2010
 Happy Parents, 2014
 Happy Sex 2, 2019
 Une histoire d'hommes, 2013
 What a wonderful world (2 tomes, 2015-2016)
 Esmera, art by Vince
 Un bruit étrange et beau, 2016
 The End, 2018
 Ce que nous sommes, 2022

Awards
 1993: Sierre Comics Festival Prix de l'humour
 1995: Livres Hebdo  Prix Jeunesse 
 1996: Angoulême Festival, Alph Art jeunesse, for C'est pô juste!
 1996:  Sierre Comics Festival Prix du public
 2003: Angoulême Festival Audience Award
 2004: Grand Prix de la ville d'Angoulême and Angoulême Festival Best promotional comic
 2007: Prix Canal J for best youth comic for Titeuf
 2009: Prix Canal J for Titeuf

Notes

Sources

 Zep publications in Spirou BDoubliées 
 Zep albums Bedetheque

External links
 Zep biography on Lambiek Comiclopedia
 Zep site on Glénat 

Swiss comics artists
Swiss comics writers
Swiss illustrators
Album-cover and concert-poster artists
1967 births
Living people
Grand Prix de la ville d'Angoulême winners